Ota's mountain lizard (Cristidorsa otai) is a species of lizard in the family Agamidae. The species is native to Southern Asia.

Etymology
The specific name, otai, is in honor of Japanese herpetologist Hidetoshi Ota (born 1959).

Geographic range
C. otai is endemic to Mizoram state in northeastern India.

Description
Adult males of C. otai are  snout-to-vent length (SVL). Females are larger, at   SVL.

References

Further reading
Mahony, Stephen (2009). "A new species of Japalura (Reptilia: Agamidae) from northeast India with a discussion of the similar species Japalura sagittifera Smith, 1940 and Japalura planidorsata Jerdon, 1870". Zootaxa 2212: 41–61. (Japalura otai, new species).
Wang, Kai; Che, Jing; Lin, Simin; Deepak, V; Aniruddha, Datta-Roy; Jiang, Ke; Jin, Jieqiong; Chen, Hongman; Siler, Cameron D. (2018). "Multilocus phylogeny and revised classification for mountain dragons of the genus Japalura s.l. (Reptilia: Agamidae: Draconinae) from Asia". Zoological Journal of the Linnean Society 185 (1): 246–267. (Cristidorsa, new genus; Cristidorsa otai, new combination).

Cristidorsa
Reptiles of India
Reptiles described in 2009